TV8 Television is a television broadcasting station in Mongolia. It is owned by Bayarmunkh Sengee of Seruuleg Construction LLC.

History
It was established in 2006.

In 2014, the channel switched to HD technology.

See also
Media of Mongolia
Communications in Mongolia

References

Television companies of Mongolia
Television channels and stations established in 1997